36 Vayadhinile is a 2015 Indian Tamil-language comedy drama film directed by Rosshan Andrrews, which is a remake of his own Malayalam film How Old Are You (2014), and produced by Suriya Sivakumar under his production studio 2D Entertainment, marking his debut as a producer. The film stars Jyothika marking her comeback to films after an eight-year hiatus, while Rahman, Abhirami, Nassar, Delhi Ganesh and Siddhartha Basu appear in other prominent roles. The film's soundtrack was composed by Santhosh Narayanan, with cinematography and editing handled by R. Diwakaran and Mahesh Narayanan respectively. The film released on 15 May 2015 and met with positive reviews by praising Jyothika's performances, emotional weight, social message. she was awarded Filmfare Critics Award for Best Actress at 63rd Britannia South Filmfare Awards.

Plot
36-year-old Vasanthi is a UD clerk in the Revenue Department; her husband Tamizhselvan works at All India Radio. Tamizhselvan aspires to emigrate to Ireland, but Vasanthi cannot accompany him as most Irish companies refuse her job applications because of her age being a problem. There is nothing interesting about her life; she leads a mundane life but she craves for a change.

One day, Vasanthi is summoned by the IG, Rajan to his office and she learns that the President of India would like to have a conversation with her. The meeting ends in disaster after she faints in front of the President and she becomes the subject of Facebook memes and before long, she watches helplessly as her husband and daughter Mithila fly away to Ireland.

Vasanthi's old classmate Susan David, now a successful CMO, reminds her of the bold, strong-willed woman she used to be and inspires her to rediscover her younger self, a woman with big dreams and aspirations. Vasanthi, who is encouraged to have bigger goals in her life, gets an idea through a wedding catering order. She learns about the unhealthy market vegetables that are sprayed with toxic pesticides, and refines her home greenhouse while appealing to other women in her neighbourhood to start their own greenhouses for the welfare of their families.

Susan gets Vasanthi a slot in the region's annual architectural conference, which is graced by the bigwigs of the country, and her talk on organic greenhouse farming concept is well received by the audience. Despite resistance and lack of support from her husband, Vasanthi persists on with her new project, which turns out to be a big success as she was able to fulfill the demand of the wedding catering order and materialise her idea. She receives regional and national acclaim for her endeavours. Following this success, Vasanthi once again gets an invitation from the President of India. This time, Vasanthi is unwavering and cleverly answers the questions of the President, and finally gets the respect and appreciation of her husband and daughter that she deserves.

Cast

Jyothika as Vasanthi Tamizhselvan (Voice dubbed by Savitha Reddy)
Rahman as Tamizhselvan (Ram Prasad in Telugu)
Abhirami as Susan David
Nassar as Commissioner Rajan
Siddhartha Basu as President of India
Amritha Anil as Mithila Tamizhselvan
Delhi Ganesh as Vasanthi's father-in-law
Kalaranjini as Vasanthi's mother-in-law
Bose Venkat as Police Officer
Ilavarasu as Vegetable Merchant
Khalid Hussain as Plants Creative Officer
Sethu Lakshmi as Thulasi 
M. S. Bhaskar as Stephen
Devadarshini as Girija Sreenivasan
Prem as Jayachandran
Sujatha Sivakumar as Raani
Mohan Raman as Nalabagam Chellur Pichai
Vazhakku En Muthuraman as Vasanthi's superior
Bayilvan Ranganathan as Bayilvan Ranganathan
Scissor Manohar as Auto driver
Rajasekar as retired teacher and neighbour
 Karnaa Radha
 Mippu
Vettai Muthukumar as Kurian

Production
In August 2014, it was announced that actress Jyothika would make a comeback to acting after a seven-year sabbatical by featuring in the Tamil remake of Rosshan Andrrews's Malayalam film How Old Are You (2014), which featured Manju Warrier in the leading role. Jyothika's husband Suriya agreed to produce the venture under his production banner 2D Entertainment, while director and writer Rosshan Andrrews and Bobby Sanjay were retained from the original version. Suriya revealed that Jyothika and he were impressed by the Malayalam version and Jyothika took two days to agree to make a return as an actress. Actor Rahman was added to the cast in October 2014, to play the role originally played by Kunchacko Boban. Music director Santhosh Narayanan was signed on to compose the film's score and soundtrack.

The shoot of the film began in November 2014 and shoots were planned to take place in Chennai, Delhi and Rajasthan. The final scene of the film was first shot, with scenes of Jyothika's character meeting the President, played by Siddharth Basu, at Rashtrapati Bhavan filmed in New Delhi. During the first schedule, actress Abhirami also signed on to portray a pivotal role, marking a comeback to Tamil films after an eleven-year absence. Jyotika extended the film's shoot in April 2015, for the song "Rasathi" at a set erected at AVM Studios in Chennai.

Music

The soundtrack and background score for 36 Vayadhinile was composed by Santhosh Narayanan. The soundtrack album features eleven tracks, which includes three songs, five instrumentals from the original score and three karaoke numbers. The lyrics for the three songs were written by Vivek. The film's audio was launched on 6 April 2015, at The Leela Palace Hotel in Chennai, with the presence of actors Suriya, Karthi and Sivakumar, which was hosted by Dhivyadharshini. The film's trailer and two songs, "Rasathi" and "Happy – Naalu Kazhudha" were performed live by Santhosh at the event.

The album received positive reviews. Sify gave the album 4 out of 5 stars and wrote, "Santhosh Narayanan delivers another terrific album adding to the list of his impressive filmography. 36 Vayadhinile has a good collection of some catchy songs & soothing background score which is a great attribute to the movie". Behindwoods gave 3 out of 5 stating "Some inspiration inducing musical pieces by Santhosh Narayanan for Jyothika's come back." Indiaglitz gave 2.75 out of 5 stating "'36 Vayadhinile' is yet another master piece from Santhosh Narayanan. Wait no more to dive into beautiful music!" Moviecrow gave 3 out of 5 stating "On the whole, this is one modest album which will play out better on-screen."

Release
The satellite rights of the film were sold to Jaya TV. The film's first look poster was released on 8 March 2015, coinciding with International Women's Day and on the same day, the makers unveiled the teaser of the film. The trailer of the film was released at the audio launch, which held on 6 April 2015. Initially planned to release in April 2015, the release was scheduled on 15 April 2015. The film was dubbed in Telugu as 36 Vayasulo and released on 24 July 2020 on Aha.

Reception

Critical response 
The film received positive reviews from critics. Sify wrote "Overall, 36 Vayadhinile is a better film than the most of the so called commercial movies and it is must watch for the family audiences who seek quality entertainment. There are some positive messages that the film conveys, which also need to be appreciated". The Times of India rated 3.5 of 5 and wrote "36 Vayadhinile might be a familiar tale of women empowerment, but the issues that it deals with [..] are very valid". Rediff gave the film 3 stars and wrote "A simple yet effective script, well executed by the director, coupled with some enjoyable music, and the wonderful performance of Jyothika definitely make 36 Vayadhinile worth a watch". Manju Warrier & Jyothika made their long sabbatical break from acting in their language versions respectively and established their second innings properly from then on, with so many other bold performances. However, Baradwaj Rangan of The Hindu gave a negative review, stating "36 Vayadhinile is not cinema. It's, at best, a glorified television soap, broadly written and staged and performed, and blaring its messages through a megaphone".

Box office
36 Vayadhinile has collected  from the Tamil Nadu box office till May 2015. The film was declared a commercial success two weeks after its release.

Awards and honours

References

External links
 
 
 36 Vayadhinile Aggregated Reviews at Vimarsi.com

2015 films
2010s Tamil-language films
Films about women in India
Tamil remakes of Malayalam films
Indian feminist films
Films scored by Santhosh Narayanan
Films set in Delhi
Films shot in Delhi
Cultural depictions of Indian people
Films directed by Rosshan Andrrews